Mussa Moloh (born in the mid to late 1800s) is regarded as the last king of the Fuladu kingdom in the Senegambia region of Africa.  Moloh was known to work with colonial powers to keep power and thwart rebellions; this would later lead to his downfall.

The Fulbe Empire 
The Fuladu kingdom was founded, born of rebellion led by Mussa Moloh’s father, Moloh Eggue, also known as Alfa Moloh, against the Mandinka who formerly ruled the Gambia region.  Those Mandingo rulers who once owned the land now the Fulbe state remained inside the kingdom once belonging to them.  The scape of this empire  in demographical terms was wide and diverse, despite the Fulbes being generally regarded as a homogenous group. Being a diverse group ultimately led to cultural struggles of power leading Alfa Moloh to quarrel with some groups causing these groups to leave the Fulbe state. The core of Alfa’s following was the Fulbe Firdu.  Consisting of roughly 30,000, the Firdu moved north to make permanent settlements in Tomari and Jimana, two of the former Mandingo kingdoms in the Gambia valley. Later, the Fulbe empire would turn into a state directly resulting from the efforts of Alfa’s son, Mussa Moloh.

Life 
Following the militaristic expansion by Mussa’s father, Moloh Eggue, Mussa had a large influence in the Fuladu empire in the Senegambia region . Mussa became a great military leader as well as a political representative during meetings with the British. Upon his father’s death in 1880, Mussa accepted the rule of his uncle’s Bakary Demba  over the Fuladu empire. as was the custom of the time . Despite the rule of his uncle, Mussa maintained both political and military control over a large area of what is now Senegalese Kolda.

During the years after 1867, Mussa would unite the disorderly followers of his father and turn them into a legitimate political and military force.  Mussa divided Fuladu into 40 regions administered by leaders chosen by Mussa that consisted of Mandingo, Serahuli, and Wolof.  His family members would also serve as district leaders that would sometimes become paramount while Mussa went off to fight, as Mussa was a great military mind and leader for the Fulbe state.  The Fuladu kingdom would endure until about 1903 when colonial rule would overtake the Fulbe state and dethrone Mussa Moloh, causing him to exile into Gambia.

Throughout the years Mussa would control the entire area due to French assistance, who considered Mussa a powerful ally in their expansion into Casamance, Senegal. Mussa Moloh’s rise to power was brought about by deception, while he was known to play kinsmen and betray the allies he had made . Into the early 1890s Mussa Moloh came to be considered the legitimate ruler of Fuladu by the European powers . Mussa maintained France as an ally while simultaneously maintaining a diplomatic and commercial allegiance with the English.  In 1903, the French took control over the Fulbe state and Mussa Moloh was sent into exile.  He was granted asylum by the British in the area of Fuladu West where he was hosted by his close friend, Dembo Dansoe.  Eventually Mussa would be deported by the British to Sierra Leone for breaking an agreement with the British government.  Mussa Moloh   died in  1931 in the region of Kesserekunda.

Political interaction by Mussa with colonial powers 
The period surrounding the Fuladu kingdom was the same period as the first treaties with European colonizers in the 1880s.  This comes as no surprise as Mussa Moloh was known to work with both the French powers and the British powers. Mussa Molo did his best to maintain cross border control of the Fuladu kingdom despite it being split three ways between the English, French and Portuguese.  This was made easier by Mussa Moloh’s ability to create partnerships with colonial powers to thwart internal rebellions against Mussa and to also expand the territory of the Fuladu kingdom, the most prominent of these alliances was with the French.  Although these alliances gave Mussa a temporary heightened position of power, they would ultimately lead to Mussa’s downfall as they would push him out of power in the Fulbe state.  To clarify, the alliances struck with the colonial powers were not those of blind cooperation, the underlying desires of the British and French were those of colonization, relationships made with the leaders of African states were later used by these powers to seize control of the areas where an alliance was struck.  For example, French powers would aid in the thwarting of rebellion to minimize resistance against them when they would later take control over regions.   Alliances were used to passively gain political power in areas like the Fuladu kingdom.

References 

Fula history
Senegambian royalty
19th-century births
1931 deaths
Year of birth unknown